The 1996 African Cup of Nations Final was a football match that took place on 3 February 1996 at the FNB Stadium in Johannesburg, South Africa, to determine the winner of the 1996 African Cup of Nations, the football championship of Africa organized by the Confederation of African Football (CAF).

South Africa won their first title, beating Tunisia 2–0. The match was attended by both then-president Nelson Mandela, deputy president F. W. de Klerk and by then Sport Minister Steve Tshwete, and Bafana Bafana were congratulated by them, lifting the trophy in front of the multiracial home crowd.

Route to the final

Match

Details

References

External links
Final match details - worldfootball.net  11v11.com
Qualifications details - rsssf

1996 African Cup of Nations
Africa Cup of Nations finals
1996 in African football
Tunisia national football team matches
South Africa national soccer team matches
February 1996 sports events in Africa
1995–96 in South African soccer
1995–96 in Tunisian football